Mishnevo is a rural locality (a village) in Vtorovskoye Rural Settlement, Kameshkovsky District, Vladimir Oblast, Russia. The population was 72 as of 2010. There is 1 street.

Geography 
Mishnevo is located 10 km south of Kameshkovo (the district's administrative centre) by road. Istomino is the nearest rural locality.

References 

Rural localities in Kameshkovsky District